Victorious Return' is a 1947 Soviet Latvian film directed by Aleksander Ivanov and . The film was directed by the Riga Film Studio.

The television broadcast of the film on Latvian TV in 1954 was the full first television broadcast in Latvian history.

Plot 
The film is based on the play Victory by Vilis Lācis. During World War II, Soviet Army lieutenant Augusts Grieze is captured as a result of treachery during a retreat. The Germans are struggling to lure him into their ranks, but he refuses, so the Germans on the radio spread messages on behalf of Augusts asking the Latvians to lay down their arms. Grieze manages to escape and becomes a lone wolf partisan. When the Soviets retake Riga, he is determined to clear his name and find the traitor - Paulis Nagla.

Starring 
 Artūrs Dimiters as Augusts Grieze
 Ludmila Špīlberga as Augusts's mother
 Velta Līne as Biruta Aže
 Leonīds Leimanis as Opmanis
 Artūrs Filipsons as Vershinin
 Visvaldis Silenieks as Draudiņš
 Pavel Volkov as Melnikov
 Edgars Zīle as Pauls Nagla
 Herberts Zommers as Obersturmbannfuhrer Budbergs (credited as Herbert Zommer)
 Jānis Osis as Headman (Municipal elder)
 Arnolds Milbrets as Pēteris
 Luijs Šmits as Teacher Vītols
 Hermanis Vazdiks as Ērmanis

References

External links 
 
Mājup ar uzvaru at Filmas.lv - the Latvian Film Database (in Latvian)

1947 films
1940s Russian-language films
Soviet drama films
1947 drama films
Soviet black-and-white films
Riga Film Studio films
Latvian-language films
Latvian drama films